Everton Anthony Williams (born 2 February 1957) is a Jamaican former professional footballer who played as a forward. He made appearances in the English Football League for Wrexham. He also played in the Welsh league for Rhyl, Bangor City, Oswestry Town and Connah's Quay Nomads. He also had a brief spell in English non-league with Bath City.

References

1957 births
Living people
Wrexham A.F.C. players
Rhyl F.C. players
Bangor City F.C. players
Bath City F.C. players
Oswestry Town F.C. players
Connah's Quay Nomads F.C. players
Jamaican footballers
Association football forwards
English Football League players